Berlin Plus may refer to:

 The Berlin Plus agreement, a short title given to an agreement between the EU and NATO.
 The Berlin Plus package, a group of eight points to be implemented in the Transnistria conflict resolution process.